"I Can Hear Your Heartbeat" is a song by British singer-songwriter Chris Rea, released in 1983 as the second single from his fifth studio album Water Sign. It was written by Rea, and produced by Rea and David Richards. "I Can Hear Your Heartbeat" reached No. 60 in the UK and No. 14 in Ireland.

Later in 1988, Rea re-recorded "I Can Hear Your Heartbeat" for his album New Light Through Old Windows, with the new version being released as a single. Produced by Rea and Jon Kelly, it reached No. 74 in the UK and No. 26 in Ireland.

Critical reception
In a retrospective review of Water Sign, Sharon Mawer of AllMusic commented on the song's "driving rock beat" and recommended the track by labelling it an AMG Pick Track. In a review of New Light Through Old Windows, Mike DeGagne of AllMusic said: "Rea's soothing voice is indeed attractive, and the songs that are included on this set are wisely chosen examples of his smooth style. "I Can Hear Your Heartbeat" and "Stainsby Girls" are two of the better tracks that showcase his slick, demure-like manner."

Track listing

Original release
7" single
 "I Can Hear Your Heartbeat" – 3:28
 "From Love to Love" – 3:31

2x 7" single (UK limited edition release)
 "I Can Hear Your Heartbeat" – 3:28
 "From Love to Love" – 3:31
 "Let It Loose" – 3:37
 "Urban Samurai" – 4:31

12" single
 "I Can Hear Your Heartbeat (Special Extended Mix)" – 5:50
 "From Love to Love" – 3:31
 "Friends Across the Water (Instrumental)" – 3:45

12" single (Canadian release)
 "I Can Hear Your Heartbeat (New Re-edited Club Mix)" – 8:15
 "Let It Loose (Extended Club Mix)" – 5:45

1988 release
7" single
 "I Can Hear Your Heartbeat" – 3:25
 "Loving You Again (Live Version)" – 5:20

7" single (Spanish promo)
 "I Can Hear Your Heartbeat" – 3:25
 "I Can Hear Your Heartbeat" – 3:25

12" single
 "I Can Hear Your Heartbeat (Extended Mix)" – 5:40
 "Giverny" – 5:34
 "Loving You Again (Live Version)" – 5:20

CD single
 "I Can Hear Your Heartbeat" – 3:26
 "Giverny" – 5:34
 "I Can Hear Your Heartbeat (Extended Mix)" – 5:40
 "Loving You Again (Live Version)" – 5:20

CD single (Japanese release)
 "I Can Hear Your Heartbeat" – 3:25
 "On the Beach - Summer '88" – 3:46

Chart performance
1983 release

1988 release

Personnel

1983 version
 Chris Rea - vocals, instruments, producer
 Ian Hawkins - bass
 Kevin Leech - piano
 David Richards - producer
 Kevin Unger - re-editing on "I Can Hear Your Heartbeat (New Re-edited Club Mix)"
 Shoot That Tiger! - sleeve design
 Fin Costello - photography
 Danny Kleinman - hand tinting

1988 version
 Chris Rea - vocals, instruments, producer
 Jon Kelly - producer
 Justin Shirley-Smith - engineer
 Paul Lilly, Danny Hyde - mixing on "Loving You Again (Live Version)"
 David Richards - producer of "Giverny"
 Greg Jakobek - sleeve illustration

References

1983 songs
1983 singles
1988 singles
Magnet Records singles
Warner Records singles
Songs written by Chris Rea
Chris Rea songs